Ali Nawaz Awan is a Pakistani politician who had been a member of the National Assembly of Pakistan from October 2018 till January 2023.

Political career
He served as the opposition leader in the Islamabad Metropolitan Corporation.

Awan was elected to the National Assembly of Pakistan as a candidate of Pakistan Tehreek-e-Insaf (PTI) from the Constituency NA-53 (Islamabad-II) in 2018 Pakistani by-elections held on 14 October 2018.

On 7 November, he was inducted into the federal cabinet of Prime Minister Imran Khan and was appointed as Special Assistant to Prime Minister on affairs of Capital Development Authority.

References

Living people
Pakistan Tehreek-e-Insaf politicians
Pakistani MNAs 2018–2023
Imran Khan administration
Year of birth missing (living people)